Greg Cackett (born 14 November 1989) is a British bobsledder. He competed in the four-man event at the 2018 Winter Olympics.

References

External links
 

1989 births
Living people
British male bobsledders
Olympic bobsledders of Great Britain
Bobsledders at the 2018 Winter Olympics
Bobsledders at the 2022 Winter Olympics
Place of birth missing (living people)